Calothamnus lehmannii, commonly known as dwarf claw flower,  is a plant in the myrtle family, Myrtaceae and is endemic to the south-west of Western Australia. It is a low-lying, sometimes ground-hugging shrub with long, thin, cylindrical leaves and clusters of red flowers that are smaller than any others in the genus Calothamnus.

Description

The flowers are arranged in small clusters and partly buried in the corky bark of the stems. The upper two bundles contain only 4 or 5 stamens and the lower ones are reduced to a single stamen. Flowering occurs between August and October and is followed by fruits which are woody capsules.

Taxonomy and naming
Calothamnus lehmannii was first formally described by Johannes Schauer in 1843 in Dissertatio phytographica de Regelia, Beaufortia et Calothamno. The specific epithet (lehmannii) honours the German botanist, Johann Lehmann. (In 2014 Craven, Edwards and Cowley proposed that the species be renamed Melaleuca johannis-lehmannii.)

Distribution and habitat
Calothamnus lehmannii occurs in and between the Bowelling and Stirling Range districts in the Avon Wheatbelt, Esperance Plains, Jarrah Forest and Warren biogeographic regions. It grows in sandy soils on plains and hillsides.

Conservation
Calothamnus lehmannii is classified as "not threatened" by the Western Australian government department of parks and wildlife.

References

lehmannii
Myrtales of Australia
Plants described in 1843
Endemic flora of Western Australia